Rotella may refer to:

Animals
Argalista rotella, a sea snail of family Colloniidae
Homalopoma rotella, a sea snail of family Colloniidae
Microgaza rotella, a sea snail of family Solariellidae

People with the surname
Carlo Rotella, American writer and academic
Franco Rotella (1966–2009), Italian footballer
John Rotella, American saxophonist
Kate Rotella (born 1964), American politician
Mark Rotella (born 1967), American author
Mimmo Rotella (1918–2006), Italian artist and poet 
Perry Rotella (born 1963), American businessman
Sebastian Rotella, American journalist and novelist

Other uses
Rotella, Marche, a comune (municipality) in the Province of Ascoli Piceno, Italy
Shell Rotella, a line of heavy duty diesel engine lubrication products produced by Shell Oil Company

See also
 Rodela (disambiguation)